Mosman Council is a local government area on the Lower North Shore of Sydney, New South Wales, Australia.

The Mayor of Mosman Council is Cr. Carolyn Corrigan, a representative of the Serving Mosman independent political group since 9 September 2017.

Suburbs and localities in the local government area
 Mosman

In February 1997, the Government gazetted that they had assigned the suburb of Mosman as the only suburb in the Municipality of Mosman. However, Mosman Council decided that residents should continue to be allowed to use the traditional locality names if they wished.

The municipality also includes, manages and maintains the following localities and locations:

Demographics 
Aboriginal and Torres Strait Islander people made up 0.2 per cent of the population, significantly below the NSW and Australian averages of 2.9 and 2.8 per cent respectively. The median age of people in the Mosman Council area was 42 years, significantly above the national average of 38 years. Children aged 0 – 14 years made up 17.6 per cent of the population and people aged 65 years and over made up 19.1 per cent of the population. Of people in the area aged 15 years and over, 51.8 per cent were married and 10.3 per cent were either divorced or separated.

At the 2016 census, the population in the Mosman Council area increased by 3.72 per cent. This was lower than the national average rate of total population growth of Australia for the same period, which was 8.8 per cent. The median weekly income for residents within the Mosman Council area was nearly double the national average.

Slightly below 50 per cent of residents in the Mosman Council area nominated an affiliation with Christianity at the 2016 census, compared with the national average of 52.1 per cent. The proportion of residents with no religion was on par with the national average. Compared to the national average, at the 2016 census, households in the Mosman local government area had a low proportion (18.6 per cent) where two or more languages are spoken (national average was 22.2 per cent); and a high proportion (77.9 per cent) where English only was spoken at home (national average was 72.7 per cent).

Council

Composition and election methods

Current composition and election method
Mosman Council comprises seven Councillors, including the Mayor, for a fixed four-year term of office. The Mayor has been directly elected since 2012 while the six other Councillors are elected proportionally as one ward. The Deputy Mayor is elected annually by the councillors. From the 2008 elections to the 2012 elections, the area was divided into three wards (Mosman Bay, Middle Harbour, Balmoral), each electing three councillors and the mayor was elected by the councillors annually. The most recent election was held on 4 December 2021, and the makeup of the Council, including the Mayor, is as follows:

The current Council, elected in 2021, in order of election, is:

History

Mosman was first incorporated in 1867 as the "Mossmans Ward" of the Municipality of St Leonards, which lasted until 1890 when the boroughs of Victoria, St Leonards and East St Leonards merged to form the Borough of North Sydney, with the Mosman ward renamed as the "Mossman Ward". Following a petition submitted by residents in 1892, on 11 April 1893 the ward's separation as the Borough of Mosman was proclaimed by Lieutenant-Governor Sir Frederick Darley. The first nine-member council was elected on 9 June 1893, with the first mayor, Richard Hayes Harnett Jr., elected on the same day. From 28 December 1906, following the passing of the Local Government Act, 1906, the council was renamed as the "Municipality of Mosman". With the passing of the Local Government Act, 1993, the Municipality of Mosman was legally renamed as Mosman Council and aldermen were renamed councillors.

A 2015 review of local government boundaries by the NSW Government Independent Pricing and Regulatory Tribunal recommended that the Municipality of Mosman merge with adjoining councils. The government considered two proposals. The alternative, proposed by Warringah Council on 23 February 2016, was for an amalgamation of the Pittwater, Manly and Warringah councils. As a consequence of Warringah's proposal, the New South Wales Minister for Local Government Paul Toole proposed that the North Sydney, Willoughby and Mosman Councils be merged. In July 2017, the Berejiklian government decided to abandon the forced merger of the North Sydney, Willoughby and Mosman local government areas, along with several other proposed forced mergers.

Heritage listings
Mosman Council has a number of heritage-listed sites, including:
 Balmoral, The Esplanade: Balmoral Bathers Pavilion
 Georges Head, Chowder Bay Road: Georges Head Fortifications
 Middle Head, Middle Head Road: Middle Head Fortifications
 Mosman, Avenue Road: Mosman Bay Sewage Aqueduct
 Mosman, 1 Avenue Road: Monterey
 Mosman, 3a Avenue Road: The Barn, Scout Hall
 Mosman, 114 Belmont Road: Alma House
 Mosman, Bradleys Head Road  (within Sydney Harbour NP): Bradleys Head Fortification Complex
 Mosman, 34 Bullecourt Avenue: Woolley House
 Mosman, 42 Cowles Road: 42 Cowles Road, Mosman
 Mosman, 624-632 Military Road: Boronia House
 Mosman, 28 Mistral Avenue: 28 Mistral Avenue, Mosman
 Mosman, 65 Parriwi Road: Igloo House
 Port Jackson, Bradleys Head: Bradleys Head Light

Sister city

See also

Local government areas of New South Wales

References

External links
 Mosman Council website

 
Mosman
1893 establishments in Australia

zh:摩士曼自治市